Byeolmangseong Fortress, lit.  Preventing Foreign Invasions Byeolmangseongji  is a military stronghold from Joseon Period, around the 14th century, located in Ansan, Korea. It linked the two valleys and was guarding the nearby seacoast.

It is classified as Gyeonggi Province monument No. 73.

It was abandoned in the 17th century. Heavily damaged during the Korean War, it was partially rebuilt since (in 1988).

An art festival is held there annually in the Fall.

References

External links
Byeolmangseongji  at Ansan Homepage

Ansan
Tourist attractions in South Korea